The Royal Barcelona Board Trade  was the leading institution for regulating, representing and promoting Catalan commercial and industrial activity in the 18th and 19th century with jurisdiction over the whole Principality of Catalonia. It was created in Barcelona in 1758 and replaced in 1847 by the Provincial Board of Agriculture, Industry and Commerce.

History and function
After the suppression of the Consulate of the Sea and the universities under the Nueva Planta decrees, local merchants sought a new institution to regulate and support commerce, trade and agriculture and to represent them to royal authorities. It was recognised that traders needed to be trained in accounting, navigators were needed to transport products across the Atlantic, designers were needed to make the products more attractive to consumers, chemists were needed to prepare dyes and other products, technicians were needed to improve agriculture.

The Board of Trade was mainly focused on improving the textile industry including securing trade protection, issuing manufacturing and guild regulations and encouraged research into manufacturing processes. It agitated for the abolition of the bubble tax in 1769 and the opening of Catalonia to American commerce in 1778. Although the Board mostly represented the interests of the big merchants, it also provided a lot of support to artisans and guilds as well as the petite bourgeoisie.

The Board encouraged technical  and artistic education, disseminating scientific knowledge coming from abroad, and encouraged innovation in production and trade. It established schools of sailing and navigation (1769), drawing and the fine arts (1775), shorthand (1775), trade (1787), bureau of machines (1804), chemistry (1805), botany and agriculture (1807), mechanics (1808) physics (1814) and economics (1814). Evening classes and free drawing and engraving courses for chintz factory workers was crucial to the growth of that industry and helped to consolidate Barcelona as a city of manufacturing in the mid 18th century.

Building
The former seat of the Consulate of the Sea in  Barcelona, the Llotja de Mar which had been used as barracks since 1714, was granted to the Board of Trade in 1767. The Board remodeled the site and built a neoclassical building, between 1774 and 1802. This building covered (and preserved) the 14th century trading hall.

See also
 Barcelona Trading Company
 History of the cotton industry in Catalonia

References

External links
 History of the University of Barcelona
 Encyclopedia.cat
 La Llojta de Mar

Bibliography
 
 
 
 
 

Companies established in 1758
1758 establishments in Spain
Spanish colonization of the Americas
Trading companies of Spain